Showdown is a sport for the blind and visually impaired which could be described as the blind community's answer to air hockey, or table tennis. It is growing very quickly around the world. It is also played by sighted players, but they are not allowed to participate in the International Blind Sports Federation (IBSA) tournaments. Showdown is widely spread in Europe, but it's also played in: Africa, Asia, North America, and South America. After the success of Showdown at the 1996 Atlanta Paralympics, representatives from more than thirty countries contacted the International Blind Sports Federation Showdown Subcommittee. They wanted information about equipment, blueprints, and rules so they could play this game in their country. Currently, the IBSA Showdown Sub-committee is encouraging regional and national Showdown Tournaments in an effort to have international championships which, hopefully, will lead to sanctioning by the Paralympics.

Equipment 

The sport is comparatively inexpensive to start up, requires minimal maintenance, and can be played in a room the size of a classroom. The only equipment needed is the specially designed table, two paddles, a special ball into which BBs have been inserted to make it audible, opaque goggles, and a glove to protect the batting hand. The table can be disassembled and stored away after play if necessary.

How to play the game 

The game is played by 2 players, on a rectangular table with a centre board screen, and goal pockets on either short sides. The objective of the game is to bat the ball across the table, under the centreboard screen, into the opponent's goal, while the opponent tries to prevent this from happening. The players have to wear eye protection, to ensure that they won't be able to see the ball. Play is always initiated with a serve. To serve correctly, players must hit the ball so that it bounces off the side wall of the table exactly once, before passing under the centre screen. If not performed correctly, 1 point will be awarded to the opponent. Each player serves two times in a row. A player scores two points for a goal and one point when their opponent hits the ball into the screen, hits the ball off the table, touches the ball with the bat or the batting hand within the goal area, touches the ball with anything but the bat, or traps or stops the ball for more than 2 seconds, making the ball inaudible for the opponent. One point is also awarded to the opponent if a player touches his or her eye protection without first asking permission. 
Matches are usually played in 3 sets, best of 2 wins. The first player to reach 11 points, leading by 2 or more points  wins the set. The exceptions are semifinals, and  finals where best of 3 sets wins. Players will change sides after each set in match play. In the last set of the match the players will switch sides after 6 points are scored by 1 player or after half of stop time has expired. Spectators must be quiet during play, so as not to interfere with the players ability to hear the ball. Cheering is however allowed after the referee has whistled.

History 

In the 1960s, Joe Lewis, a totally blind Canadian, wanted to find a sport specifically designed so that individuals with visual impairments or blindness could play without sighted assistance. He ended up inventing the game of Showdown, which now is played by the visually impaired, as well as by the sighted, all over the world. Over the years, Patrick York, a totally blind, Canadian athlete, has collaborated with Lewis on refinements to the rules and equipment. Additional rules have evolved from different parts of the world to make the game what it is today.
Showdown was an international success at its debut as a recreational sport during the 1980 Olympiad for the Physically Disabled in Arnhem, the Netherlands . International interest was sparked and Showdown was played recreationally at the: 1984 Olympics for the Disabled in Long Island, USA; 1988 Summer Paralympics in Seoul, South Korea; 1990 World Youth Games in St. Etienne, France; 1990 World Championships in Assen, The Netherlands; 1992 Summer Paralympics in Barcelona, Spain; and at the 1996 Summer Paralympics in Atlanta, the United States. Today, Showdown is being played extensively in countries throughout Europe, and in a few countries in Africa, Asia and South America as well. In North America, where it was invented, it has been slow to cross the borders into mainstream usage.

Showdown countries

Europe 

In Europe Showdown is played in at least 20 countries:
Belgium, Bulgaria, Cyprus, Czech Republic, Denmark, Estonia, Finland, France, Germany, Hungary, Italy, Latvia, Lithuania, the Netherlands, Norway, Poland, Slovakia, Slovenia, Sweden, Switzerland and Turkey.

Africa 

We know that they are playing showdown in the following countries in Africa:
Ghana, Uganda, South Africa, Kenya and Morocco.
It has however proved to be really hard to get information about How many players there are, and how much they are playing.

Asia 

Very little is known about the development of the sport in Asia. In The Philippines they started playing quite recently.
In South Korea is so widely played that some players have participated in some international tournaments and Jun Hyoung Kim, Dong Hyun Kim and Min Sun An was the first players in a World Championship, in 2019 in Olbia. 
In Mongolia they are on their way to do it. In Barein, Kuwait they bought a table and started a few years ago. Players from Sweden have also brought the sport to the Iranian part of  Kurdistan. In China and Japan they have been playing for a few years. 
Unfortunately that's all the information currently available about Asia.

North America 

James Mastro is teaching people how to play showdown, or Power-Showdown, as he calls it,  in the United States. He is also building tables for it, and it is currently played in 6 different states.

Most people chose to play for more recreational purposes, making it difficult to start professional tournaments.

South America 

Players from the Netherlands have brought the sport to Suriname.
In Colombia they built their first showdown table and started playing showdown in December 2009. Matthieu Juglar, a showdown player from  France has with enthusiasm helped them to get started.

Championships and tournaments 

National Championships and other tournaments are held in the following countries in Europe:
Cyprus, The Czech Republic, Denmark, Estonia, Finland, Italy, Lithuania, The Netherlands, The Slovak Republic, Slovenia, Sweden and Switzerland. 
The first official IBSA world championship was held in Stockholm, Sweden in August 2009, and included participants from: Canada, The Czech Republic, Denmark, Estonia, Finland, Germany, Iran, Italy, Morocco, The Netherlands, Poland, The Slovak Republic, Slovenia, Sweden, and the United States. The last World Championship was in Olbia (Italy) from September, 30 to October 6, 2019. The current World champions are: Adrian Sloninka (Poland) and Elzbieta Mielzcarek (Poland).

References

External links
IBSA web page
the official website for Showdown in Sweden
The official German Showdown Website / Offizielle deutsche Showdown-Webseite
The official Swiss Showdown Website / Offizielle Schweizer Showdown-Webseite
Italian showdown website

Showdown